Tyndale Theological Seminary is an interdenominational Evangelical Christian seminary in Badhoevedorp, The Netherlands.

History
The school was founded in 1985 by the American organization Greater Europe Mission.

Tyndale prepares students to become pastors, teachers, missionaries and denominational leaders. It is a graduate professional school (Dutch hogerberoepsonderwijs), offering accredited masters programs in the English language.

References

External links 
Official website

Evangelicalism in the Netherlands
Interdenominational seminaries and theological colleges
Seminaries and theological colleges in the Netherlands